Michał Pius Römer (later using the Lithuanian form Mykolas Römeris) (1880 in Bagdoniškis – 1945 in Vilnius) was a Lithuanian-Polish lawyer, scientist and politician.

Biography

Early years 
Römer was born in Lithuania into a Polish noble family of Baltic-German (Livonian) origin. He was one of szlachta members loyal to the heritage of the Grand Duchy of Lithuania, referred to as Krajowcy. His father was Michał Kazimierz Römer and mother was Konstancja Tukałło.

He attended the Law School in Sankt-Peterburg (1893–1901) and later studied history in Kraków (1901–1902), after that he moved to Paris to study in École des sciences politiques (1902–1905). He gave the lecture on cultural-ethnographic situation in Lithuania in Café Voltaire, together with another Lithuanian activist, Tadas Ivanauskas. It was later published in Kraków by "Krytyka" under a title: Stosunki etnograficzno-kulturalne na Litwie. 

In 1905, he returned to Lithuania, where he began to work for the restoration of Lithuanian statehood, not dominated by any nationalism. As he put it, he tried to persuade the Poles settled in Lithuania to have "a common national citizenship without renouncing cultural and national distinctions". To this end, he and  founded the "Gazeta Wileńska", which was published from 15 February 1906. The radical paper was soon closed, on 7 July that year, although it already had 2,000 subscribers. Romer had to flee to Kraków, for fear of being arrested. 

In 1908 he wrote Lithuania: Study of national revival (Litwa: studium odrodzenia narodowego). In his work he justified the rights of Lithuanians to their own statehood. He refuted accusations that Lithuanian activists were Russian agents. He also defended the right of Lithuanian Poles to preserve their own identity in the future Lithuanian state.  

Later that year he came back to Vilnius, when he continued his publicist work. He wrote works on Poles in Lithuania and Ruthenia and on Lithuanians in East Prussia (Litwini w Prusach Książęcych, 1911). He joined the Society of Friends of Science in Wilno and accompanied Ludwik Krzywicki on his archaeological work in Samogitia.

First World War 
At the beginning of the war, Römer maintained contacts with independence and socialist circles in Warsaw, and distributed leaflets in Lithuania. He worked on the editorial board of the re-established "Przegląd Wileński". In March 1915, he took the Lithuanian politicians Mykolas Sleževičius and Jurgis Šaulys to Warsaw for a meeting with Stanisław Patek. He established contacts with the Legions' movement. In May 1915, he broke through the frontline to Kraków. In August, he submitted an extensive memorandum to the Supreme National Committee entitled Lithuania at War (Litwa wobec wojny).

In November, he himself joined the legions, but was hospitalised due to the harsh living conditions at the front. He was then sent to the editorial office of "Wiadomości Polskie". During the oath crisis he withdrew from Legions and became the district judge in Łomża in 1917.

Interwar period 
In March 1919 he came to Warsaw at Józef Piłsudski request. Piłsudski sent him to Kaunas to head a government composed of Poles and Lithuanians. Romer arrived in Kaunas on 15 April, but his plans were rejected by Lithuanian politicians. He then returned to Vilnius, which was then in Polish hands, but did not take up any public office. In September 1920, after the Lithuanian army had taken over Vilnius, he became the head of "Gazeta Krajowa". The paper supported Lithuanian statehood, respecting the Polish language and culture. After the capture of Vilnius by General Lucjan Żeligowski, he went to Kaunas and in a letter to Józef Piłsudski protested against the violation of Lithuania's rights to its capital.  He chose instead to move to Kaunas, which had become the temporary capital of the recently re-established independent Republic of Lithuania.

He was a notable figure in the interwar Lithuania, and was a member of the Lithuanian Supreme Tribunal (1921–1928) and the State Council of Lithuania (1928–1931). He was a professor at the University of Lithuania/Vytautas Magnus University (1922–1940), Vilnius University (1940–1945), and the rector of the University of Lithuania for three terms (1927–1928, 1933–36 and 1936–1939). As an international lawyer, in 1932 he represented Lithuania at the Permanent Court of International Justice regarding the Klaipėda Directorate. The court found in Lithuania's favor that Otto Böttcher had violated the Statute of the Klaipėda Region. He published a work on this matter entitled: Le système juridique des garanties de la souveraineté de la Lithuanie sur le territoire de Memel (1936).

Römer wrote important works on Lithuanian history and on law, such as the 1908 book Litwa. Studyum o odrodzeniu narodu litewskiego and the 1928 book Die Verfassungsreform Litauens im Jahre 1928. He is considered to be one of the most prominent Lithuanian jurists, the progenitor, first lector and one of the most prominent authors of interwar Lithuanian constitutional law. While most of his writings on Lithuanian law were written in Lithuanian and his signature on Lithuanian documents and letters was Mykolas Römeris, (sometimes also credited as Mykolas Rėmeris or Mykolas Riomeris), he continued to write his diary in Polish and use the German form of his name (Michael von Römer) for his law writings in German. He did not break his ties with Polishness, and still was publishing in Polish, for example Litwy z Kowna ("Letters from Kaunas"). He willingly visited Poland and hosted Polish personalities visiting Lithuania.

Second World War 
In February 1940 he moved to Vilnius, where the Lithuanian University, of which he was rector, had been transferred. He organised meetings of Lithuanian and Polish activists in an attempt to find common ground. He remained in this position after the occupation of Lithuania by the USSR. After the university was closed down by the Germans, he took part in secret teaching. He maintained contacts with the Polish underground movement. He returned to the university after the Red Army entered Vilnius. He died on 22 February 1945. He was buried on Rasos Cemetery.

Commemoration 
The Law University of Lithuania in Vilnius was renamed to the Mykolas Romeris University in 2004.

Publications
 Michał Römer, Stosunki etnograficzno-kulturalne na Litwie, Kraków 1906.
 Michał Römer, Litwa. Studyum o odrodzeniu narodu litewskiego, Lwów 1908.
 Michał Römer, Litwini w Prusiech Książęcych, Kraków 1911.
 Michał Römer, Dzień 6 sierpnia 1914 roku, Warszawa 1916.
 Michał Römer, Litewskie stronnictwa polityczne, Wilno 1921.
 Mykolas Römeris, Le système juridique des garanties de la souveraineté de la Lithuanie sur le territoire de Memel, Paris 1930.
 Michael von Römer, Die Verfassungsreform Litauens vom Jahre 1928, München 1930.
 Mykolas Römeris, Valstybė ir jos konstitucinė teisė, Kaunas 1934–1939.
 Mykolas Römeris, Lietuvos konstitucinės teisės paskaitos (Cours de droit constitutionnel lithuanien), Kaunas 1937.
 Michał Römer, Zasługi Ludwika Krzywickiego wobec nauki litewskiej, Warszawa 1938.
 Michał Römer, Organizacja władzy politycznej w rozwoju konstytucyjnym Republiki Litewskiej, Warszawa 1939. 
 Mykolas Römeris. Lietuva. Studija apie lietuvių tautos atgimimą. 
 Mykolas Römeris. Konstitucinės ir teismo teisės pasieniuose.

References

Bibliography 
 
 Academical biography. Retrieved 2007-10-02
 
 
 

1880 births
1945 deaths
People from Rokiškis District Municipality
People from Novoalexandrovsky Uyezd
Römer family
Lithuanian people of Baltic German descent
Lithuanian people of Polish descent
Krajowcy
Lithuanian scholars of constitutional law
Rectors of Vytautas Magnus University
Academic staff of Vilnius University
Polish legionnaires (World War I)
Burials at Rasos Cemetery

be:Міхал Ромер